William Reid (29 October 1882 – 29 December 1950) was an Australian cricketer. He played in one first-class match for Tasmania in 1908/09.

See also
 List of Tasmanian representative cricketers

References

External links
 

1882 births
1950 deaths
Australian cricketers
Tasmania cricketers
Cricketers from Launceston, Tasmania